Jacob Polley (born 1975) is a British poet and novelist. He has published four collections of poetry. His novel, Talk of the Town, won the Somerset Maugham Award in 2009. His latest poetry collection, Jackself, won the T.S. Eliot Prize in 2016. Polley has co-written two short films and collaborated on multimedia poetry installations in the United Kingdom.

Early life and education
Jacob Polley was born in 1975 in Carlisle, United Kingdom. He grew up in Bowness-on-Solway, He studied English at Lancaster University from 1993 to 1996 and earned an MA in English and Creative Writing at the University in 1997.

Career
After graduation, Polley worked in various jobs,  eventually landing the position of poet-in-residence at the Cumberland News in Carlisle. He taught poetry in local schools and later was awarded a two year fellowship at Trinity College, Cambridge.
He was poet-in-residence at the Wordsworth Trust in 2002.

Polley published his first poetry collection, The Brink, (Picador UK) in 2002. The collection  was a Poetry Book Society Choice, and went on to be shortlisted for the T.S. Eliot Prize. From 2005 to 2007, Polley was a Visiting Fellow Commoner in the Arts at Trinity College.

Polley's second collection, Little Gods (Picador UK, 2006), was a Poetry Book Society Recommendation. In 2009, Polley published his first novel, Talk of the Town. The book was published in 2009 by Picador UK and went on to win the 2010 Somerset Maugham Award and was also shortlisted for the Desmond Elliott Prize. In 2010, Polley was offered a position as lecturer at University of St. Andrews. In 2011, Polley was invited to Australia to be  Arts Queensland’s poet-in-residence.

The Havocs (Pickador UK, 2012), is Polley's third collection of poetry. It was a Poetry Book Society Recommendation and won the 2012 Geoffrey Faber Memorial Prize. It was also shortlisted for the Forward Prize for Best Collection and for the T.S. Eliot Prize in 2012.

Polley partnered with director Ian Fenton as co-writer on two short films, Flickerman and the Ivory-Skinned Woman (2002) and Keeping House (2015).

Jackself, Polley's latest collection of poetry, published in 2016 by Picador UK, won the prestigious T.S. Eliot Prize in 2016. Polley's collection was described by judges as "a firework of a book".

In 2017, Polley collaborated with Dutch musicians, Strijbos and Van Rijswijk, to make 'To Travel and to Matter' - a poetry and sound installation project for the Lake District."

Polley lectures at Newcastle University and lives in Fife, Scotland.

Selected publications
 Jackself, (Picador UK, 2016), 
 The Havocs, (Picador UK, 2012), 
  Talk of the Town, (Picador UK, 2009),   
  Little Gods, (Picador UK, 2006),    
 The Brink, (Picador UK, 2003),

Screenwriting
Keeping House, with co-writer and director, Ian Fenton, (2015), Short film  
Flickerman and the Ivory-skinned Woman, with co-writer and director Ian Fenton, (2002), Short film

Awards
 T.S. Eliot Prize, Jackself, (2016) 
 Forward Poetry for Best Collection, The Havocs, (2013) 
 Shortlisted for the T.S. Eliot Prize, The Havocs, (2012) 
 Geoffrey Faber Memorial Prize, The Havocs, (2012) 
 Somerset Maugham Award for Talk of the Town, (2010) 
 Selected one of Next Generation Poets from the Poetry Book Society, (2004)
 Shortlisted for the T.S. Eliot Prize, The Brink, (2012)
 Eric Gregory Award from the Society of Authors, (2002)

References

External links
To Travel and to Matter, Lake District Walking Experience
Keeping House (2015), short film

1975 births
Living people
Alumni of Lancaster University
People from Carlisle, Cumbria
21st-century British poets
21st-century English male writers
English male poets
T. S. Eliot Prize winners